The Sultan-ul-Uloom Education Society is a non-profit organisation based in Hyderabad, India, which aimed at providing quality education to minority students. It runs several educational institutions in the city.

History 
The society was established in 1980.

Campus 
The 22-acre SUES campus is located in Banjara Hills.

Institutions 
 Muffakham Jah College of Engineering and Technology
 Amjad Ali Khan College of Business Administration
 Ghulam Ahmed College of Education
 Sultan-ul-Uloom College of Pharmacy
 Sultan-ul-Uloom College of Law
 Sultan-ul-Uloom Public School

References 

Non-profit organisations based in India